Dischi Ricordi is an Italian record company founded on  by  and Franco Crepax (brother of Guido Crepax), active from 1958 to 1994.

History 
Dischi Ricordi had its seat in Milan (Via Giovanni Berchet, 2). In 1994, the company was bought by BMG, who acquired the catalog while maintaining the historical logo. In October 1958, the 1st album was released by Maria Callas and, at the beginning of November, the first 45 RPM by Giorgio Gaber.

Among the many artists published are: Gino Paoli, Luigi Tenco, Ornella Vanoni, Umberto Bindi, Sergio Endrigo, Enzo Jannacci, Quartetto Cetra, Emilio Pericoli, Bobby Solo, Lucio Battisti, Fabrizio De André, Dik Dik, Equipe 84, Edoardo Bennato, Banco del Mutuo Soccorso, Patty Pravo, Milva, Mia Martini, Franco Califano.

In 1994, the year that saw the artists Aleandro Baldi and Giorgio Faletti (produced by the label) to peak 1st and 2nd at the Sanremo Music Festival, Guido Rignano, last owner signs the bill of sale of the "Gruppo Ricordi" to the multinational BMG.

See also 
Casa Ricordi
List of record labels

References 

Mario De Luigi, The record industry in Italy, Side Side editions, Rome, 1982
Mario De Luigi, History of the phonographic industry in Italy, Music and Dischi edition, Milan, 2008

External links

Italian record labels
Record labels established in 1958
Record labels disestablished in 1994
1959 births
Living people
Music in Milan
Italian companies established in 1958